Serigne Mouhamadou Moustapha Mbacké (Serigne Muhammadu Moustapha Mbacke; Wolof: Sëriñ Muhammadu Mustafaa Mbàkke; 1888-1945) was a Senegalese religious leader. He served as the first Caliph of the Mouride brotherhood, a large Sufi order based in Senegal, from 1927 until his death on July 13, 1945. He was the son of Sufi saint and religious leader Sheikh Amadou Bamba.

Life
Serigne Mouhamadou Moustapha Mbacké was born in 1888 in Daaru Salaam, Senegal. His mother was Soxna Aminata Lo, while his maternal uncle, Serigne Ndame Abdu Rahman Lo, taught him Quranic studies. He became the first Mouride caliph after his father, Sheikh Amadou Bamba, died in 1927.

References

Mouride caliphs
People from Touba, Senegal
1888 births
1945 deaths